The 2012 Championship League was a professional non-ranking snooker tournament that was played from 9 January to 22 March 2012 at the Crondon Park Golf Club in Stock, England.

Matthew Stevens was the defending champion, but he was eliminated in group four.

Ding Junhui won in the final 3–1 against Judd Trump and earned a place in the 2012 Premier League Snooker.

Prize fund
The breakdown of prize money for this year is shown below:

Group 1–7
Winner: £3,000
Runner-up: £2,000
Semi-final: £1,000
Frame-win (league stage): £100
Frame-win (play-offs): £300
Highest break: £500
Final group
Winner: £10,000
Runner-up: £5,000
Semi-final: £3,000
Frame-win: £300
Highest break: £1,000

Tournament total: £192,700

Group one
Group one matches were played on 9 and 10 January 2012. Judd Trump was the first player to qualify for the final group.

Matches

Matthew Stevens 1–3 Mark Selby
Shaun Murphy 2–3 Judd Trump
Ali Carter 1–3 Mark Davis
Andrew Higginson 3–1 Matthew Stevens
Mark Selby  3–2 Shaun Murphy
Judd Trump 3–0 Ali Carter
Mark Davis 3–1 Andrew Higginson
Matthew Stevens 2–3 Shaun Murphy
Mark Selby 3–1 Judd Trump
Ali Carter 3–0 Andrew Higginson
Shaun Murphy 3–1 Andrew Higginson
Mark Davis 3–2 Judd Trump
Matthew Stevens 1–3 Mark Davis
Mark Selby 3–2 Ali Carter
Judd Trump 3–2 Andrew Higginson
Shaun Murphy 3–0 Mark Davis
Mark Selby 1–3 Andrew Higginson
Matthew Stevens 3–0 Ali Carter
Shaun Murphy 2–3 Ali Carter
Mark Selby 3–2 Mark Davis
Judd Trump 0–3 Matthew Stevens

Table

Play-offs

Group two
Group two matches were played on 11 and 12 January 2012. Shaun Murphy was the second player to qualify for the final group.

Matches

Shaun Murphy 1–3 Mark Selby
Mark Davis 3–1 Matthew Stevens
Mark Williams 3–2 Neil Robertson
Stuart Bingham 1–3 Shaun Murphy
Mark Selby 3–1 Mark Davis
Matthew Stevens 2–3 Mark Williams
Neil Robertson 0–3 Stuart Bingham
Shaun Murphy 3–0 Mark Davis
Mark Selby 3–2 Matthew Stevens
Mark Williams 0–3 Stuart Bingham
Mark Davis 3–0 Stuart Bingham
Neil Robertson 3–2 Matthew Stevens
Shaun Murphy 2–3 Neil Robertson
Mark Selby 3–2 Mark Williams
Matthew Stevens 3–1 Stuart Bingham
Mark Davis 2–3 Neil Robertson
Mark Selby 3–2 Stuart Bingham
Shaun Murphy 3–0 Mark Williams
Mark Davis 3–0 Mark Williams
Mark Selby 3–1 Neil Robertson
Shaun Murphy 1–3 Matthew Stevens

Table

Play-offs

Group three
Group three matches were played on 23 and 24 January 2012. Neil Robertson was the third player to qualify for the final group.

Matches

Mark Selby 3–0 Mark Davis
Neil Robertson 3–2 Matthew Stevens
Martin Gould 1–3 Jamie Cope
Stephen Hendry 2–3 Mark Selby
Mark Davis 3–2 Neil Robertson
Matthew Stevens 1–3 Martin Gould
Jamie Cope 3–2 Stephen Hendry
Mark Selby 3–0 Neil Robertson
Mark Davis 2–3 Matthew Stevens
Martin Gould 3–2 Stephen Hendry
Neil Robertson 3–1 Stephen Hendry
Jamie Cope 0–3 Matthew Stevens
Mark Selby 3–2 Jamie Cope
Mark Davis 3–0 Martin Gould
Matthew Stevens 3–2 Stephen Hendry
Neil Robertson 3–1 Jamie Cope
Mark Davis 3–1 Stephen Hendry
Mark Selby 2–3 Martin Gould
Neil Robertson 3–1 Martin Gould
Mark Davis 1–3 Jamie Cope
Mark Selby 1–3 Matthew Stevens

Table

Play-offs

Group four
Group four matches were played on 25 and 26 January 2012. Mark Davis was the fourth player to qualify for the final group.

Matches

Mark Selby 3–2 Matthew Stevens
Mark Davis 3–1 Jamie Cope
Mark Allen 3–1 Stephen Lee
Peter Ebdon 0–3 Mark Selby
Matthew Stevens 2–3 Mark Davis
Jamie Cope 3–2 Mark Allen
Stephen Lee 2–3 Peter Ebdon
Mark Selby 3–0 Mark Davis
Matthew Stevens 2–3 Jamie Cope
Mark Allen 0–3 Peter Ebdon
Mark Davis 3–1 Peter Ebdon
Stephen Lee 3–2 Jamie Cope
Mark Selby 3–1 Stephen Lee
Matthew Stevens 1–3 Mark Allen
Jamie Cope 1–3 Peter Ebdon
Mark Davis 3–0 Stephen Lee
Matthew Stevens 0–3 Peter Ebdon
Mark Selby 3–2 Mark Allen
Matthew Stevens 3–2 Stephen Lee
Mark Davis 0–3 Mark Allen
Mark Selby 3–0 Jamie Cope

Table

Play-offs

Group five
Group five matches were played on 6 and 7 February 2012. Barry Hawkins was the fifth player to qualify for the final group.

Matches

Peter Ebdon 1–3 Mark Allen
Jamie Cope 0–3 Barry Hawkins
Ricky Walden 1–3 Mark King
Mark Selby 2–3 Mark Allen
Mark Selby 1–3 Peter Ebdon
Mark Allen 3–2 Jamie Cope
Barry Hawkins 0–3 Ricky Walden
Mark King 1–3 Mark Selby
Peter Ebdon 2–3 Jamie Cope
Barry Hawkins 3–1 Mark King
Mark Allen 2–3 Mark King
Ricky Walden 0–3 Jamie Cope
Mark Selby 3–0 Ricky Walden
Peter Ebdon 2–3 Barry Hawkins
Jamie Cope 1–3 Mark King
Mark Allen 3–2 Ricky Walden
Peter Ebdon 3–2 Mark King
Mark Selby 2–3 Barry Hawkins
Peter Ebdon 3–0 Ricky Walden
Mark Allen 3–0 Barry Hawkins
Mark Selby  2–3 Jamie Cope

Table

Play-offs

Group six
Group six matches were played on 8 and 9 February 2012. Mark Allen was the sixth player to qualify for the final group.

Matches

Mark King 1–3 Mark Allen
Peter Ebdon 3–2 Jamie Cope
Marcus Campbell 3–0 Joe Perry
Dominic Dale 3–1 Mark King
Mark Allen 3–0 Peter Ebdon
Jamie Cope 3–1 Marcus Campbell
Joe Perry 1–3 Dominic Dale
Mark King 1–3 Peter Ebdon
Mark Allen 3–0 Jamie Cope
Marcus Campbell 3–2 Dominic Dale
Joe Perry 3–1 Jamie Cope
Peter Ebdon 3–2 Dominic Dale
Mark King 2–3 Joe Perry
Mark Allen 3–2 Marcus Campbell
Peter Ebdon 3–1 Joe Perry
Dominic Dale 3–2 Jamie Cope
Mark Allen 3–2 Dominic Dale
Mark King 2–3 Marcus Campbell
Peter Ebdon 3–1 Marcus Campbell
Mark King 3–1 Jamie Cope
Mark Allen 2–3 Joe Perry

Table

Play-offs

Group seven
Group seven matches were played on 19 and 20 March 2012. Ding Junhui was the last player to qualify for the final group.

Matches

Dominic Dale 3–1 Peter Ebdon
Marcus Campbell 3–1 Joe Perry
Ding Junhui 2–3 Ryan Day
Tom Ford 3–0 Dominic Dale
Peter Ebdon 1–3 Marcus Campbell
Joe Perry 2–3 Ding Junhui
Ryan Day 1–3 Tom Ford
Dominic Dale 3–1 Marcus Campbell
Peter Ebdon 2–3 Joe Perry
Ding Junhui 1–3 Tom Ford
Marcus Campbell 2–3 Tom Ford
Ryan Day 3–0 Joe Perry
Dominic Dale 0–3 Ryan Day
Peter Ebdon 1–3 Ding Junhui
Joe Perry 1–3 Tom Ford
Marcus Campbell 3–0 Ryan Day
Peter Ebdon 3–0 Tom Ford
Dominic Dale 0–3 Ding Junhui
Marcus Campbell 2–3 Ding Junhui
Peter Ebdon 3–2 Ryan Day
Dominic Dale 2–3 Joe Perry

Table

Play-offs

Final group
The matches of the final group were played on 21 and 22 March 2012. Ding Junhui has qualified for the 2012 Premier League.

Matches

Judd Trump 3–1 Shaun Murphy
Neil Robertson 1–3 Mark Davis
Barry Hawkins 1–3 Mark Allen
Ding Junhui 2–3 Judd Trump
Shaun Murphy 3–2 Neil Robertson
Mark Davis 1–3 Barry Hawkins
Mark Allen 2–3 Ding Junhui
Judd Trump 3–1 Neil Robertson
Shaun Murphy 3–2 Mark Davis
Barry Hawkins 0–3 Ding Junhui
Neil Robertson 0–3 Ding Junhui
Mark Allen 3–2 Mark Davis
Judd Trump 1–3 Mark Allen
Shaun Murphy 0–3 Barry Hawkins
Mark Davis 1–3 Ding Junhui
Neil Robertson 3–1 Mark Allen
Shaun Murphy 3–2 Ding Junhui
Judd Trump 2–3 Barry Hawkins
Neil Robertson 3–2 Barry Hawkins
Shaun Murphy 1–3 Mark Allen
Judd Trump 2–3 Mark Davis

Table

Play-offs

Century breaks
Total: 111

 144 (W), 134, 130, 128, 125, 116, 115, 103, 100, 100  Mark Allen
 143 (2), 136, 127, 116, 115, 113, 109, 106  Neil Robertson
 142 (3), 142 (4), 138, 136, 133, 129, 128, 128, 122, 121, 118, 116, 111, 110, 110, 107, 100, 100  Mark Selby
 142 (6), 136, 122, 111, 101, 100  Peter Ebdon
 142, 127, 122, 117, 109, 105, 104, 102  Ding Junhui
 142 (5)  Ricky Walden
 139 (7)  Marcus Campbell
 137, 125, 102  Dominic Dale
 136, 131, 122, 110, 108, 101, 100  Jamie Cope
 136, 120, 115, 110, 105, 100  Shaun Murphy
 135 (1)  Andrew Higginson
 133, 128, 100, 100  Mark Davis
 131, 121, 119, 118, 110, 109, 104, 101  Judd Trump
 130, 110, 108, 101  Martin Gould
 128, 103  Mark King
 127, 122, 118, 107, 105, 101  Matthew Stevens
 125, 112  Stephen Hendry
 123, 105, 101  Tom Ford
 122, 116  Ryan Day
 122, 115, 110, 110, 107, 100  Barry Hawkins
 120, 118, 101  Ali Carter
 101  Stephen Lee
 100  Joe Perry

Bold: highest break in the indicated group.

Winnings 

Green: Won the group. Bold: Highest break in the group. All prize money in GBP.

References

External links
 

2012
Championship League
Championship League